The Halberstadt B-types of the Halberstädter Flugzeugwerke were two-seat unarmed reconnaissance/training aircraft of the German Air Force in the First World War.

Development 
In 1914, Halberstadt developed a biplane with the Oberursel U.0 rotary engine with 80 hp, which was referred to as Halberstadt B.I and was given the factory name A15. The Halberstadt B.II (B15) was built with a Mercedes D.I inline engine with 105 hp and in 1915 the Halberstadt B.III was produced with the slightly stronger Mercedes D.II (120 hp).

Halberstadt B.II was used as the base for the first armed two-seater, the Halberstadt CL.II.

Variants
A15Company designation of the aircraft that became the B.I
B15Company designation of the aircraft that became the B.II
B.I (Company A15) Reconnaissance aircraft powered by a  Oberursel U.0 rotary engine.
B.II (Company B15) Reconnaissance aircraft powered by a  Mercedes D.I in-line engine.
B.III (Company B15) Reconnaissance aircraft powered by a  Mercedes D.II in-line engine.

Operational history 
The B.I was used as a trainer aircraft, while the B.II and B.III briefly served as reconnaissance aircraft, but were later also used for pilot training.

Specifications (B.II)

References

Further reading
 

Halberstadt aircraft
1910s German military trainer aircraft
1910s German military reconnaissance aircraft
Aircraft first flown in 1915